The Salem Raiders were a professional hockey team that played in the Eastern Hockey League (EHL) and Atlantic Coast Hockey League (ACHL). They were originally the Utica Mohawks from 1978 to 1980 then became the Salem Raiders for the 1980–81 season before transferring to the Atlantic Coast Hockey League during the 1981–82 season.

The Salem Raiders were coached by former Colorado Rockies coach Patrick Kelly, who led the Raiders to a league-best regular season record of 32–15–0. Salem defeated the Winston-Salem Thunderbirds in the first round of the playoffs, but eventually lost to the Mohawk Valley Stars in the Payne Trophy Finals.

The Raiders were led by 1981–82 ACHL MVP Dave MacQueen, who had 43 goals and 73 points in 36 games, and Tom Mullen, who led the team with 35 assists. MacQueen's goals and points totals and Mullen's assists totals led the league in their respective categories.

The Salem Raiders were then sold to Henry Brabham and re-branded as the Virginia Raiders for the 1982–83 season, but continued to play in the Salem Civic Center. Coach Pat Kelly was retained and the Raiders played 65 games compiling a record of 20 wins, 36 losses, and 9 ties for 51 points. They placed fourth in the six team ACHL, making the playoffs and lost in the first round. Brabham disbanded the team in 1983 citing financial losses and not coming to terms on a long term lease in Salem.

References

External links
Salem Raiders of the ACHL at hockeydb.com
Virginia Raiders at hockeydb.com

Atlantic Coast Hockey League teams
Eastern Hockey League (1978–1981) teams
Ice hockey clubs established in 1980
Ice hockey clubs disestablished in 1983
1980 establishments in Virginia
Ice hockey teams in Virginia
1983 disestablishments in Virginia
Viking Age in popular culture
Boston Bruins minor league affiliates